The 25th Genie Awards were held on March 21, 2005 to honour the best Canadian films released in 2004. The awards took place at the Metro Toronto Convention Centre in Toronto.

Andrea Martin was the host.

Nominees and winners
The Genie Award winner in each category is shown in bold text.

Notes

References

Genie
Genie
25